The 2022–23 Ranji Trophy was the 88th season of the Ranji Trophy, the premier first-class cricket tournament in India. It was played from 13 December 2022 and was finished on 19 February 2023. Madhya Pradesh were the defending champions, winning their first Ranji Trophy title previous season.

During this season, Sikkim hosted Ranji Trophy matches for the first time. Narayanan Janani, Vrinda Rathi and Gayathri Venugopalan became the first female umpires to officiate in the Ranji Trophy.

In the final, Saurashtra defeated Bengal by 9 wickets to win their second title.

Format
Unlike the last season, where all teams were competed for the same trophy, in this season BCCI enforced the Promotion and relegation format. This Ranji trophy had two winners to improve the standard and competitiveness of the tournament. The teams were divided into two categories named as Elite category having 32 teams split into four groups, with Plate category having 6 teams. The Elite group teams played each other once, with the top two teams from each group qualified for the quarter-finals. In the Plate Group also teams played each other once, but the top four teams qualified for the plate group knockouts, with the bottom two teams played for the fifth and sixth positions, another playoff for third and fourth positions took place. The two Plate finalists will be promoted to the Elite group for the next season, 2023-24, while the bottom two teams of all the four Elite groups combined - factoring in both points and quotient will be relegated to Plate group.

The teams were placed in the following groups:

League stage

Group A

Group B

Group C

Group D

Plate Group

Plate Knockouts

Plate Semi-finals

Plate Final

Knockout stage

Quarter-finals

Semi-finals

Final

Statistics

 On 2 January, Saurashtra bowler Jaydev Unadkat became the first player to take a hat-trick in the first over of a Ranji Trophy match.
 On 12 January, Mumbai batter Prithvi Shaw made second highest score in an inning in Ranji history by a batter. He scored 379 runs.
 On 19 January, Vidarbha defended a target of 73 runs against Gujarat, which is the lowest target defended in the Ranji Trophy.

Notes

References

External links
 Series home at ESPN Cricinfo

Ranji Trophy seasons
Ranji Trophy Trophy
Ranji Trophy
Ranji Trophy